James Michael Rosenbaum (born 1944) is an American lawyer and former United States district judge of the United States District Court for the District of Minnesota. He is currently an arbitrator and mediator in private practice.

Education and career

Born in Fort Snelling, Minnesota, Rosenbaum received a Bachelor of Arts degree from the University of Minnesota in 1966. He received a Juris Doctor from University of Minnesota Law School in 1969. He was an attorney for VISTA in Chicago, Illinois from 1969 to 1970. He was a staff attorney of the Leadership Council for Metropolitan Open Communities in Chicago from 1970 to 1972. He was in private practice of law in Minneapolis, Minnesota from 1973 to 1981. He was the United States Attorney for the District of Minnesota from 1981 to 1985.

Federal judicial service

Rosenbaum was nominated by President Ronald Reagan on June 14, 1985, to the United States District Court for the District of Minnesota, to a new seat created by 98 Stat. 333. He was confirmed by the United States Senate on July 16, 1985, and received commission on July 18, 1985. He served as Chief Judge from 2001 to 2008. He assumed senior status on October 26, 2009. His service terminated on August 25, 2010, due to retirement.

Post judicial service

After his retirement from the federal bench, Rosenbaum joined JAMS, the largest private provider of mediation and arbitration services worldwide, at its resolution center in Minnesota. Rosenbaum specializes as a mediator, arbitrator and discovery master in Minnesota and throughout the country. He manages disputes ranging from intellectual property and patent matters, complex and class action litigation, domestic and international, securities, civil rights, environmental and employment.

Personal

His wife, Marilyn B. Rosenbaum (b. 1944), is also a judge in Hennepin County District Court.

References

Sources
 

1944 births
Living people
People from Fort Snelling, Minnesota
Judges of the United States District Court for the District of Minnesota
United States Attorneys for the District of Minnesota
United States district court judges appointed by Ronald Reagan
20th-century American judges
University of Minnesota Law School alumni